Walker Canyon is a canyon in the Temescal Mountains, in Riverside County, California. It lies divides Alberhill Summit, on the west and the balance of the range to its east. Coming from the Temescal Mountains to the east, Gavilan Wash has its confluence with Walker Canyon near mid way along its length, and Alberhill Canyon has its confluence with Walker Canyon at its mouth.

Near Lake Elsinore, California, I-15 passes  between Temescal Valley and Warm Springs Valley through Walker Canyon on the east side of Temescal Creek.

References

Canyons and gorges of California
Landforms of Riverside County, California
Temescal Mountains